Ignacio Garro Gómez de Carrero (born 21 April 1981 in Vitoria-Gasteiz, Álava), known as Nacho Garro, is a Spanish retired footballer who played as a central midfielder.

Honours
Spain U16
UEFA European Under-16 Championship: 1997

External links

1981 births
Living people
Footballers from Vitoria-Gasteiz
Spanish footballers
Athletic Bilbao footballers
Association football midfielders
Segunda División players
Segunda División B players
Bilbao Athletic footballers
Burgos CF footballers
Real Murcia players
UD Las Palmas players
Deportivo Alavés players
SD Eibar footballers
CD Mirandés footballers
Spain youth international footballers